Poznań Główny, anglicised to Poznan Main, is the chief railway station for the city of Poznań, Poland's fifth-largest city, and capital of the Greater Poland Province.

The station is located at a junction of Warsaw–Kunowice railway, Wrocław–Poznań railway, Kluczbork–Poznań railway, Poznań–Szczecin railway and Poznań–Piła railway. The train services are operated by PKP, Polregio and Koleje Wielkopolskie.

Investment and modernization

PKP began planning a modernisation of the station in 2007. In 2009 it began negotiations with seven companies specialising in investments in commercial real estate. A 160 million euro investment agreement was signed with developer Trigranit Development Corporation, paving the way for the construction of an integrated transport centre including a rebuilt station, car parking and a coach station.

The station and the surrounding area are being completely rebuilt, and connected to the bus station and the international congress/convention centre. The entire investment aimed to provide an integrated transport complex for UEFA Euro 2012 in Poznan. Construction of the new station began in the first half of 2011, and the first phase, a fully operational booking hall and waiting area, was inaugurated by President Bronisaw Komorowski on 29 May 2012. The old booking hall still exists but is not currently in use for passengers.

An integrated transport hub and shopping centre was opened on 25 October 2013. This features 250 retail units, a coach terminal, cycle lanes and a park and ride facility.

Due to the city's 2010 budget deficit, which resulted from using public funds to build a municipal stadium, the city of Poznan announced that most of the promised investment will be significantly delayed in time, and could remain un-financed even up to 2016. Under a planned third phase, the existing station building would be redeveloped with conference, office and hotel facilities. A study by TTS trade magazine informed in 2014 that the new building was already completed.

History
 Ignacy Jan Paderewski arrived at the Summer Station (platform 4b) on December 26, 1918, beginning a visit to Poznan which resulted in the outbreak of the Greater Poland Uprising (1918–19). 
 Along the main road leading from the station to the city centre are a large number of anti-aircraft bunkers from World War II. 
 During communist rule an underground hospital was prepared at the station in case of war. It was fully equipped and regularly visited by the secret services. 
 Platform 4a was used twice a day by steam trains to Wolsztyn until 2014.  
 On November 25, 2006 Ryszard Kapuscinski unveiled a plaque in the hall of the station dedicated to Kazimierz Nowak, who travelled 40,000 km through Africa on foot and by bicycle. 
 Trains are announced by computer. It is so far the only such system operated in Poland, which from 1996 to 2012 was voiced by Paul Binkowski, New Theatre actor. Currently the system uses a speech synthesis, IVONA.
 Several acres of land around the railway station were the subject of a dispute between the railway authorities, the city and the authorities of Wielkopolska from the 1990s. The railway authorities in Warsaw did not want to give this land to the City of Poznan, despite not using it. After long negotiations, the Integrated Transportation Centre (Pol. "Zintegrowane Centrum Komunikacyjne") is being built on it.

Destinations

 Babimost (REGIO), (TLK)
 Berlin, (EC),(EN)
 Białystok (TLK)
 Bielsko-Biała (TLK)
 Brest (EN)
 Bydgoszcz (REGIO), (TLK), (EC)
 Frankfurt (Oder) (EC), (EN)
 Gdańsk (REGIO), (TLK), (EC)
 Gdynia (REGIO), (TLK), (EC)
 Gorzów Wielkopolski (REGIO), (TLK)
 Gniezno (REGIO), (TLK), (EC)
 Grodzisk Wielkopolski (REGIO)
 Inowrocław (REGIO), (IC), (TLK), (EC)
 Jarocin (REGIO), (IC), (TLK)
 Katowice (IC), (TLK)
 Kalisz (REGIO)
 Kępno (REGIO), (IC), (TLK)
 Kluczbork (REGIO)
 Kłodawa (REGIO)
 Kłodzko (REGIO)
 Kołobrzeg (REGIO),(TLK)
 Konin (REGIO),(IC),(EC),(TLK),(Ex)
 Koszalin (REGIO)
 Kraków (REGIO), (TLK)
 Krotoszyn (REGIO)
 Krzyż (REGIO), (TLK), (Ex), (IC)
 Kudowa-Zdrój (REGIO)
 Kutno (REGIO), (TLK), (Ex), (IC), (EC)
 Leszno (REGIO), (TLK), (Ex), (IC)
 Lublin (REGIO), (TLK)
 Lubliniec (REGIO), (TLK)
 Łódź (REGIO), (TLK)
 Łuków (REGIO)
 Minsk (EN)
 Mogilno (REGIO)
 Moscow (EN)
 Olsztyn (TLK), (IC)
 Ostrów Wielkopolski (REGIO)
 Paris (EN)
 Piła (REGIO)
 Przemyśl (REGIO)
 Rawicz (REGIO)
 Saratów (REGIO)
 Słupsk (REGIO)
 Suwałki (REGIO)
 Szczecin (REGIO), (TLK), (Ex), (IC), (EIC)
 Świnoujście (REGIO), (TLK), (Ex), (IC)
 Terespol (TLK)
 Toruń (REGIO)
 Ustka (REGIO)
 Wałbrzych (REGIO)
 Warsaw (KM), (REGIO), (TLK), (Ex), (EC), (IC), (EIC)
 Wągrowiec (REGIO)
 Wolsztyn (REGIO)
 Wieluń (REGIO)
 Wrocław (REGIO), (TLK), (Ex), (IC)
 Września (REGIO)
 Zakopane (REGIO)
 Zakrzewo (REGIO)
 Zbąszynek (REGIO), (TLK), (Ex), (EC)
 Zielona Góra (REGIO), (TLK), (Ex)

Abbreviations: (EN/EC) = international routes operated in conjunction with foreign rail operators,
(TLK/IC/EIC) = operated by PKP Intercity,
(REGIO) = operated by Polregio and other regional operators.

Train services
The station is served by the following services:

EuroCity services (EC) (EC 95 by DB) (EIC by PKP) Berlin - Frankfurt (Oder) - Rzepin - Poznan - Kutno - Warsaw
EuroCity services (EC) (EC 95 by DB) (IC by PKP) Berlin - Frankfurt (Oder) - Rzepin - Poznan - Bydgoszcz - Gdansk - Gdynia
EuroNight services (EN) Paris - Strasbourg - Berlin - Frankfurt (Oder) - Poznan - Warsaw - Brest - Minsk - Moscow
Express Intercity services (EIC) Szczecin — Warsaw 
Intercity services Swinoujscie - Szczecin - Stargard - Krzyz - Poznan - Kutno - Warsaw
Intercity services Zielona Gora - Zbaszynek - Poznan - Kutno - Warsaw
Intercity services Wroclaw - Leszno - Poznan - Bydgoszcz - Gdansk - Gdynia
Intercity services Zielona Gora - Zbaszynek - Poznan - Torun - Olsztyn
Intercity services Wroclaw - Leszno - Poznan - Torun - Ilawa - Olsztyn - Elk - Bialystok
Intercity services Bydgoszcz - Poznan - Kutno - Lowicz - Lodz - Krakow
Intercity services (IC) Swinoujscie - Szczecin - Stargard - Krzyz - Poznan - Leszno - Wroclaw - Opole - Katowice
Intercity services Kolobrzeg - Pila - Poznan - Wroclaw - Opole - Czestochowa - Krakow - Rzeszow - Zamosc/Przemysl
Intercity services (IC) Poznań - Ostrów Wielkopolski - Kępno - Lubliniec - Częstochowa - Kraków 
Intercity services Poznan - Ostrow Wielkopolskie - Lubliniec - Katowice
Intercity services (TLK) Poznań - Ostrów Wielkopolski - Kępno - Lubliniec - Częstochowa - Kraków 
Intercity services (TLK) Warsaw — Świnoujście 
Regional services (R) Poznan - Gniezno - Mogilno - Inowroclaw - Bydgoszcz
Regional services (R) Poznan - Gniezno - Mogilno - Inowroclaw - Torun
Regional services (R) Poznan - Sroda Wielkopolska - Jarocin - Ostrow Wielkopolski - Lodz
Regional services (R) Poznań - Kluczbork
Regional services (R) Wroclaw - Leszno - Poznan 
Regional services (R) Szczecinek - Piła Główna - Poznań Główny
Regional services (R) Szczecin - Stargard - Dobiegniew - Krzyz - Wronki - Poznan
Regional services (KW) Zbaszynek - Zbąszyn - Opalenica - Poznan
Regional services (KW) Poznan - Gniezno
Regional services (KW) Poznan - Września - Konin - Kutno
Regional services (KW) Wolsztyn - Grodzisk Wielkopolski - Poznan
Regional services (KW) Poznan - Murowana Goślina - Wągrowiec - Golancz
Regional services (KW) Poznań – Jarocin – Kępno

Tram services
Poznań has a large tram network with many services serving the station. All services are operated by MPK Poznań. The tram stops around the station are: Poznań Główny, Most Dworcowy and Dworzec Zachodni

3 (Górczyn - Poznań Główny - Rondo Rataje - Rondo Śródka - Małe Garbary - Armii Poznań - Wilczak - Naramowice)
5 (Górczyn - Poznań Główny - City Centre - Os. Lecha - Zegrze - Unii Lubelskiej)
6 (Junikowo - Budziszyńska - Stadion miejski - Poznań Główny - Rondo Rataje - Rondo Śródka - Miłostowo)
8 (Górczyn - Poznań Główny - Małe Garbary - Rondo Śródka - Miłostowo)
10 (Połabska - Armii Poznań - Poznań Główny - Dębiec)
11 (Piątkowska - Poznań Główny - Dębiec)
12 (Os. Sobieskiego - Poznań Główny - Rondo Rataje - Starołęka)
14 (Os. Sobieskiego - Poznań Główny - Górczyn)
18 (Ogrody - Rynek Jeżycki - Poznań Główny - Rondo Rataje - Os. Lecha - Franowo)

Bus and Coach services

51 (Poznań Główny - Garbary - Winogrady - Os. Sobieskiego)
68 (Poznań Główny - Podolany)
71 (Os. Wichrowe Wzgorze - Połabska - Poznań Główny - Os. Debina)
905 (Poznań Główny - Piatkowska - Suchy Las - Zlotkowo - Goleczewo - Zielatkowo - Chludowo)
59 (Poznań Główny - Poznań Ławica Airport)

Coach services operated by various Polish PKS coach companies, Flixbus and Sindbad among others depart from the coach station.

See also
Rail transport in Poland
List of busiest railway stations in Poland

References

External links
 
 Poznań Główny Railway Station - Integrated Transport Centre Website 
 Poznan Journey Planner

Railway stations in Poland opened in 1879
Transport in Poznań
Railway stations in Greater Poland Voivodeship
Railway stations served by Przewozy Regionalne InterRegio
19th-century establishments in the Province of Posen